Emir Kaan Gültekin (born 2 October 2000) is a Turkish professional footballer who plays as a winger for Süper Lig club İstanbulspor.

Career
Gültekin is a product of the youth academies of Erdemli Gençlerbirliği, Erdemli Belediyespor and Mersin İdman Yurdu. He began his senior career with Mersin in 2017, and moved to Tarsus İdman Yurdu in 2018. He transferred to İstanbulspor in August 2020, and immediately went on loan to Isparta 32 for the 2020–21 season where became the top scorer in the TFF Third League with 19 goals in 34 games. He helped İstanbulspor achieve promotion in the 2021–22 season for the first time in 17 years. He made his professional debut in İstanbulspor's return to the Süper Lig in a in a 2–0 season opening loss to Trabzonspor on 5 August 2022.

References

External links
 

2000 births
Living people
Sportspeople from Mersin
Turkish footballers
Mersin İdman Yurdu footballers
Tarsus Idman Yurdu footballers
İstanbulspor footballers
Süper Lig players
TFF First League players
TFF Second League players
TFF Third League players
Association football wingers